Michael Thomas Wright PhD, FREng, FIEE, FIMechE, CMath, FIMA, CIMgt (11 April 1947 – 10 January 2015) was a British academic who was the Vice-Chancellor of Aston University between 1996 and 2006.

Life 
Wright was born 11 April 1947 and attended Sheldon Heath School, Birmingham. He took an apprenticeship then studied Electrical Engineering at Aston University, gaining a first class degree in 1969, and a PhD in 1972.  Working in industry as an engineer, he rose to become director of several companies and returned as Professor of Mechanical Engineering in 1990. He was later Senior Pro-Vice-Chancellor, between 1994-1996, becoming Vice-Chancellor in 1996 for ten years. He retired in 2006 and died of cancer 10 January 2015. He was survived by his wife and daughter.

Honours 
FIEE 1981; FREng 1988; FIMechE 1989; FRSA 1989; CMath 1994; FIMA 1994; CCMI 1997.
He received prizes for his published academic work: IEE Student Paper Award 1970, IEEE Petrochemical Industry Author Award 1981, IEE Power Division Premium for published work 1983.

References

External links
 Aston University

1947 births
2015 deaths
Senior Members of the IEEE
Vice-Chancellors of Aston University
Academics of Aston University
British mechanical engineers
Fellows of the Royal Academy of Engineering
Fellows of the Institution of Electrical Engineers
Fellows of the Institution of Mechanical Engineers
Fellows of the Institute of Mathematics and its Applications